George Linklater Sr. was an Australian rules footballer for .

References

Port Adelaide Football Club (SANFL) players
Port Adelaide Football Club players (all competitions)